Abiansemal is a district (kecamatan) in the Badung Regency of Bali, Indonesia. It covers an area of 69.01 km2, and had a population of 88,144 at the 2010 Census and 98,904 at the 2020 Census. The capital of the district is Abiansemal.

References

Districts of Bali
Badung Regency